Vice-Admiral Colin Kenneth MacLean, CB, CVO, DSO (17 September 1876 - 12 September 1935) was a British Royal Navy officer during the First World War.

Naval career
MacLean joined the Royal Navy, and was promoted a Lieutenant in 1898. He was posted to the second-class cruiser HMS Pique on 15 February 1900.

As a Captain, he later commanded several ships, including HMS Lightfoot, HMS Spenser, and HMS Centaur, and as Rear-Admiral commanded a Destroyer flotilla. He ended his career as a naval officer in China, and retired as Vice-Admiral in 1932.

References 

1876 births
1935 deaths
Royal Navy admirals
Commanders of the Royal Victorian Order
Companions of the Distinguished Service Order
Companions of the Order of the Bath